Pirates in Callao is a 2005 Peruvian CGI science fantasy animated film directed by Eduardo Schuldt based on the children's book of the same name written by Hernán Garrido Lecca. It tells the story of Alberto, a Peruvian kid who gets lost during a school trip to the Real Felipe Fortress in the seaport of Callao. Nine-year-old Alberto falls through a hole and travels back in time to the 17th century, when the port is about to be attacked by a group of Dutch pirates led by Jacques L'Hermite. There, he meets other children who have also traveled back in time, and together they fight and defeat L'Hermite. The film is notable for being one of the first computer-animated film made in Latin America.

References
 David Cornelius. "Pirates in Callao". eFilmCritic. Retrieved on June 8, 2009.

External links
   (Requires Adobe Flash Player)
 

2005 films
2000s adventure films
2005 fantasy films
2005 science fiction films
2005 computer-animated films
Peruvian animated films
Animated films based on children's books
2000s children's fantasy films
Fantasy adventure films
Science fantasy films
2000s Peruvian films
Films set in 1969
Films set in the 1620s
Films set in Peru
Callao Region
Pirate films
Films about time travel
2000s Spanish-language films